Bulawayo South is a parliamentary constituency of the Zimbabwean National Assembly in Bulawayo, Zimbabwe. The current member of the House of Assembly for Bulawayo South is Raj Modi, a member of ZANU–PF. Notable former members include Eddie Cross and David Coltart.

Constituency profile

Bulawayo South is on the southern end of the city of Bulawayo. It is a predominantly black working-class area, with some middle- and upper-class areas. Roughly 85% of the inhabitants of the constituency are Ndebele-speaking and roughly 10% of the constituency is Shona-speaking. There are also several thousand White Zimbabweans and Indian Zimbabweans who live in the constituency as well. The working class area is centered around the Bulawayo suburbs of Sizinda, Tshabalala, and Sidojiwe (Flats), and factories as well as other industrial buildings can be found in the Belmont and Donnington industrial area. To the south, the constituency has suburbs Montrose, Newton West, Morningside, Southworld, West Somerton, and Barham Green. Prior to the 1990 election the constituency was one of the 20 white minority constituencies. The constituency has developed into a stronghold of ZANU-PF and Robert Mugabe opposition. The MDC has become a dominant presence in Bulawayo South and in 2000 saw the ZANU-PF candidate suffer a heavy loss of 51.6% of the vote. In the 2005 election, however, the ZANU-PF made a small but significant gain, while the MDC lost over 8,000 votes due in large part to poor voter turnout in the 2005 general election. The decline in support from 2005 to 2000 can also be attributed to constituency redistricting. David Coltart has remained a key member of the MDC as one of its highest-ranking members. Coltart is currently the MDC's Secretary for Legal Affairs and the Shadow Minister for Justice and Legal Affairs.

Members

Election results

2000s elections

1990s elections

1980s elections

1970s elections

See also 
Politics of Zimbabwe

References

External links 
https://web.archive.org/web/20080602035941/http://www.parlzim.gov.zw/inside.aspx?mpgid=28

Bulawayo
Parliamentary constituencies in Zimbabwe